Nachalnik Komandy (literally – chief of team, director of team) is a non-playing position of association football in the Soviet Union and the Russian Federation and some post-Soviet states. 
The sports position of Nachalnik Komandy appeared in the Soviet football in the mid 1950s and in 1990 replaced a position of coach deputy in political affairs (political director) that existed since after the World War II. The main role of a political director was organization of political lecturing (politzaniatie), composition of written characteristics (reviews) on players, reporting to leadership about morale and political condition of a collective.

Created following the World War II (the Great Patriotic War in the Soviet phraseology), the post was part of the Communist Party and KGB structure, but after the ban against the Communist Part, associated with the failed 1991 coup-d'état, it partially changed its duties officially leaving out its propaganda of communism and the Soviet life style. Since 1990 the post of Nachalnik Komandy performs clerical duties in a club.

See also
 Director of football

References

External links
 Kovalyov, I. How this works. Nachalniki Komandy of the Russian Premier League (Как это работает. Начальники команд РФПЛ). Championat.com. 9 July 2017
 Copy of the official instruction of the post (Government of Ukraine, 2002). Chief of team in type of sports (national team, club team) (Начальник команды по виду спорта (сборной, клубной)). Borovik.com.

Association football terminology
Occupations in the Communist Party of the Soviet Union
Propaganda in the Soviet Union